Information causality is a physical principle suggested in 2009. Information Causality states that information gain that a receiver (Bob) can reach about data, previously unknown to him, from a sender (Alice), by using all his local resources and  classical bits communicated by the sender, is at most  bits.

The principle assumes classical communication: if quantum bits were allowed to be transmitted the information gain could be higher as demonstrated in the quantum superdense coding protocol [this is debatable as superdense coding requires sending as many qubits - including auxiliary channels - as there are classical bits to transfer]. The principle is respected by all correlations accessible with quantum physics, while it excludes all correlations which violate the quantum Tsirelson bound for the CHSH inequality. However, it does not exclude beyond-quantum correlations in multipartite situations.

See also 
 Tsirelson's bound
 Quantum nonlocality

References 

Quantum information science